Víctor Manuel Virgen Carrera (born 2 November 1961) is a Mexican politician from the Institutional Revolutionary Party. In 2009 he served as Deputy of the LX Legislature of the Mexican Congress representing Oaxaca.

References

1961 births
Living people
People from Oaxaca
Institutional Revolutionary Party politicians
21st-century Mexican politicians
Deputies of the LX Legislature of Mexico
Members of the Chamber of Deputies (Mexico) for Oaxaca